The following is a list of awards and nominations received by Michael Shannon, an American actor known for his roles on the stage and screen.

Michael Shannon received two Academy Award nominations for Best Supporting Actor his performances in the Sam Mendes period drama Revolutionary Road (2008) and for the Tom Ford psychological thriller Nocturnal Animals (2016). He received a Golden Globe Award for Best Supporting Actor – Motion Picture nomination for his role in Ramin Bahrani's drama 99 Homes (2015). He also received three Screen Actors Guild Award nominations winning twice for Outstanding Performance by an Ensemble in a Drama Series along with the cast of the HBO period crime series Boardwalk Empire.  In 2016 he received a Tony Award for Best Featured Actor in a Play nomination for his performance as James Tyrone, Jr. in the Broadway revival production of the Eugene O'Neill play Long Day's Journey into Night.

Major associations

Academy Awards

Golden Globe Awards

Screen Actors Guild Awards

Tony Awards

Theatre awards

Miscellaneous awards

References 

Shannon, Michael